The 2014–15 TT Pro League season (known as the Digicel Pro League for sponsorship reasons) was the sixteenth season of the TT Pro League, the Trinidad and Tobago professional league for association football clubs, since its establishment in 1999. A total of nine teams contested the league, with W Connection the defending champions. The season began on 23 September 2014 and ended on 2 May 2015 with the crowning of Central FC as the league champion.

Changes from the 2013–14 season
The following changes were made since the 2013–14 season:

 There were a number of changes to the clubs competing in the 2014–15 season.
 Application for admission by Club Sando to join the Pro League was rejected after failing to meet the league's financial requirements.

Teams

Team summaries

Note: Flags indicate national team as has been defined under FIFA eligibility rules. Players may hold more than one non-FIFA nationality.

Player transfers

Managerial changes

League table

Positions by round

Results

Matches 1–18

Matches 19–27

References

External links
Official Website
Soca Warriors Online, TT Pro League

TT Pro League seasons
1
Trinidad